Meda Šeškutė (born 1 August 2003) is a Lithuanian footballer who plays as a goalkeeper for A Lyga club Gintra Universitetas and the Lithuania women's national team.

Club career
Šeškutė has played for Gintra Universitetas in Lithuania at the UEFA Women's Champions League.

International career
Šeškutė capped for Lithuania at senior level during the UEFA Women's Euro 2022 qualifying.

References

2003 births
Living people
Lithuanian women's footballers
Women's association football goalkeepers
Gintra Universitetas players
Lithuania women's international footballers